Trinitrobenzene may refer to:

 1,2,3-Trinitrobenzene
 
 1,3,5-Trinitrobenzene